Events from the year 1412 in France

Incumbents
 Monarch – Charles VI

Births

 Unknown
 Joan of Arc, folk heroine and Roman Catholic saint (died 1431)
 Thomas Basin, bishop (died 1491)

References

1410s in France